George Huston Bare (January 5, 1899 – May 26, 1981) was an American modern pentathlete. He competed at the 1924 Summer Olympics.

Biography
George Bare was born in Sardinia, Ohio on January 5, 1899. He graduated from the United States Military Academy at West Point in 1920.

He served in the United States Army for 33 years, attaining the rank of colonel. After retiring, he worked as an insurance broker.

He died in Tacoma, Washington on May 26, 1981.

References

External links
 

1899 births
1981 deaths
American male modern pentathletes
Olympic modern pentathletes of the United States
Modern pentathletes at the 1924 Summer Olympics
People from Sardinia, Ohio
Sportspeople from Ohio
20th-century American people
United States Army colonels
United States Military Academy alumni